The men's 86 kg competition in judo at the 1984 Summer Olympics in Los Angeles was held on 8 August at the California State University. The gold medal was won by Peter Seisenbacher of Austria.

Results

Pool A

Pool B

Repechages

Final

Final classification

References

Judo at the 1984 Summer Olympics
Judo at the Summer Olympics Men's Middleweight